Diana Egerton-Warburton  (born 1965) is an Australian medical professional, specialising in emergency medicine. Egerton-Warburton serves as the director of Emergency Medicine Research at Monash Medical Centre and Medical Co-Chair at Monash University of the Monash Emergency Research Collaborative (MERC).

Life and background
Egerton-Warbutron was educated at St Hilda’s School Perth, Bunbury Cathedral Grammar School [Bunbury], the University of Western Australia (MB, BS), Monash University (MPH, MClinEpi)and she was awarded Fellowship of the Australasian College for Emergency Medicine (FACEM) in 1997. Her relatives include the Drake-Brockman, Goyder and Roberts families, as well as her Egerton-Warburton wine-making cousins.

Egerton-Warburton is best-known for her research into Australia's drinking culture. She is an executive member of the National Alliance for Action on Alcohol and serves on the board of the Australian National Advisory Council for Alcohol and Drugs.

From 1997 until 2000, Egerton-Warburton was President of the Australasian Society for Emergency Medicine. In 2013, she was awarded the Australasian College for Emergency Medicine's teaching excellence medal. In 2016, the Australian Medical Association awarded Egerton-Warburton with the Women in Medicine Award in recognition for her contribution to the development of emergency medicine.

VicHealth recognised Egerton-Warburton and her Australasian College of Emergency Medicine team at the 2017 VicHealth Awards for their Alcohol Harm Snapshot Survey.

Egerton-Warburton joined the Victorian Honour Roll of Women in 2018, and in 2020 was awarded the Order of Australia Medal.

Opinions 
A vocal critic of Australia's drinking habits, Egerton-Warburton is opposed to alcohol-orientated public holidays and events such as Australia Day and the annual Beer Can Regatta in Darwin. According to Egerton-Warburton, doctors consider Australia Day to be the busiest day for the "national sport of getting drunk".

Egerton-Warburton has previously called for the sale of alcoholic drinks to be banned after 10pm, to limit the burden hospital emergency departments face by admitted alcohol-affected patients during the night. She has also been critical of the media's focus on the so-called "ice epidemic" because she believes compared to issues caused by alcohol consumption, methamphetamine use is "a very small issue".

See also 
 Colonel Peter Egerton-Warburton (ancestor)

References

External links 
 www.burkespeerage.com

1965 births
Living people
People from Western Australia
W
Australian people of English descent
Australian emergency physicians
Recipients of the Medal of the Order of Australia